Margaret Morton MBE (born 29 January 1968) is a Scottish curler and Olympic champion. She received a gold medal at the 2002 Winter Olympics in Salt Lake City with teammates Rhona Martin (skip), Deborah Knox, Fiona MacDonald, and Janice Rankin.

She was appointed Member of the Order of the British Empire (MBE) in the 2002 Birthday Honours.

References

External links
 

1968 births
Living people
Scottish female curlers
British female curlers
Olympic curlers of Great Britain
Olympic gold medallists for Great Britain
Olympic medalists in curling
Curlers at the 2002 Winter Olympics
Medalists at the 2002 Winter Olympics
Scottish Olympic medallists
People educated at Ayr Academy
Members of the Order of the British Empire